Octoknema is a genus of flowering plants in the family Olacaceae. 

It contains the following species:
Octoknema affinis 
Octoknema aruwimiensis 
Octoknema bakossiensis 
Octoknema belingensis 
Octoknema borealis 
Octoknema chailluensis 
Octoknema dinklagei 
Octoknema genovefae 
Octoknema hulstaertiana 
Octoknema kivuensis 
Octoknema klaineana 
Octoknema mokoko 
Octoknema ogoouensis 
Octoknema orientalis

References

Olacaceae
Santalales genera
Taxonomy articles created by Polbot